Pallohonka is a football club from Espoo in Finland. The club was formed in 2009 and their home ground is at the Otaniemen urheilukeskus, Otaniemi. Pallohonka is FC Honka's 'B team' and currently plays in the Kakkonen, or the third level of football in Finland.

Season to season

2010 season
 Pallohonka  are competing in Group B (Lohko B) of the Kakkonen administered by the Football Association of Finland  (Suomen Palloliitto) .  This is the third highest tier in the Finnish football system.  In 2009 Pallohonka finished in sixth position in their Kakkonen section.

References and sources
Official FC Honka Website
Finnish Wikipedia
Tulospalvelu

Football clubs in Finland
Sport in Espoo
2009 establishments in Finland